Michael William Barnes (born 3 April 1985) is an English former first-class cricketer, a right-handed batsman who played primarily as a wicketkeeper. He was born at Frimley, Surrey. He was educated at Bohunt School in Liphook, Hampshire and later at South Downs College in Waterlooville, Hampshire.

Barnes played a single first-class match for Warwickshire against Yorkshire in the 2007 County Championship. He was not called upon to bat during the match, but from behind the stumps he took 5 catches.  He also played a single List A match for Warwickshire against Lancashire in the 2007 Friends Provident Trophy.  In his only List-A match, he scored 1 not out and from behind the stumps he took 5 catches, a record for a debutant in both games.  He was released by Warwickshire at the end of the 2007 season and subsequently retired from professional cricket. Barnes now coaches for Surrey County Cricket Club and is the cricket professional for RGS Guildford.

References

External links

1985 births
Living people
Cricketers from Frimley
English cricketers
Warwickshire cricketers
Wicket-keepers